"Two Bad Neighbors" is the thirteenth episode of the seventh season of the American animated television series The Simpsons. It was written by Ken Keeler, directed by Wes Archer and inspired by the animosity toward the series' earlier run from the Bushes. In the episode, George H. W. Bush, the 41st President of the United States (voiced by Harry Shearer), moves across the street from the Simpsons. Homer seeks revenge after the former President spanks Bart for his bad behavior.

It originally aired on the Fox network in the United States on January 14, 1996. Since airing, the episode has received positive reviews from television critics, and Vanity Fair named it the fifth-best episode of the show. It acquired a Nielsen rating of 9.9, and was the second-highest-rated show on the Fox network the week it aired.

Plot
George H. W. Bush and his wife Barbara move into the empty house across the street from the Simpsons and take a liking to Ned Flanders. Although Barbara takes a liking to Bart, Bart's pranks and irreverent spirit annoy George, who spanks the boy after he accidentally shreds his memoirs and trashes the house with his outboard motor and finally becoming fed up with Bart bothering him. Despite Barbara's suggestion that he apologize, George refuses after Homer confronts him for spanking Bart.

After Homer launches bottle rockets at George's window, the next day Bush puts up a banner reading "Two Bad Neighbors" to refer to Bart and Homer, but it only confuses Ned Flanders and Dr. Hibbert with George becoming confused of Homer's name. Later, Homer and Bart use cardboard likenesses of George and Barbara's sons, George Jr. and Jeb, to lure George out of the house, where they glue a rainbow-colored wig on his head as he is about to give a speech at a local club. George retaliates by destroying the Simpsons' lawn with his car.

George spots Homer and Bart moving through underground sewers to release locusts in his house. He climbs below the street to confront them. After Homer and George brawl with George still refusing to apologize, Bart releases the locusts, which attack George. Former Soviet General Secretary Mikhail Gorbachev arrives to deliver a housewarming present for the Bushes. After pressure from his wife, George reluctantly apologizes to Homer in front of Gorbachev. The Bushes eventually move and sell their house to former President Gerald Ford. Ford invites Homer for beer and nachos during a football game broadcast at his house. Homer and Gerald find they share common ground because they are both accident-prone.

Production

Background

The show had a feud with the Bushes that eventually led to the idea for this episode. In the October 1, 1990 edition of People, Barbara Bush called The Simpsons "the dumbest thing [she] had ever seen", which had led to the writers sending a letter to Bush where they posed as Marge Simpson. Bush immediately sent a reply in which she apologized.

On January 27, 1992, then-President George H. W. Bush made a speech during his re-election campaign that reignited the feud between The Simpsons and the Bushes. At that point, family values were the cornerstone of Bush's campaign platform, to which effect he gave the following speech at the National Religious Broadcasters' convention in Washington, D.C.: "We are going to keep on trying to strengthen the American family, to make American families a lot more like the Waltons and a lot less like the Simpsons". The next broadcast of The Simpsons was a rerun of "Stark Raving Dad" on January 30, 1992. It included a new opening, which was a response to Bush's speech. The scene begins in the Simpsons' living room. Homer, Bart, Lisa, and Patty and Selma all stare at the television and watch Bush's speech. After Bush's statement Bart replies, "Hey, we're just like the Waltons. We're praying for an end to the Depression too."

During the couch gag for "Mathlete's Feat", this episode was referenced by Rick from Rick and Morty.

Writing

Bill Oakley, who was a writer on The Simpsons at the time, came up with the idea for "Two Bad Neighbors" two years before production began. Oakley got the inspiration for the episode after the feud between the Bushes and the Simpson family, and two years later when he and Josh Weinstein became showrunners of The Simpsons, they assigned Ken Keeler to write it. Oakley said that Bill Clinton had been President of the United States for two years at the point when the episode went into production, so the feud had "faded off into oblivion". The staff therefore thought it would be funny if the two parties encountered each other again.

Weinstein said that the episode is often misunderstood. Many audiences expected a political satire, while the writers made special effort to keep the parody apolitical. Oakley stresses that "it's not a political attack, it's a personal attack", and instead of criticizing Bush for his policies, the episode instead pokes fun at his "crotchetiness". Oakley considered the episode to lack many "zany" jokes common for the show at that time, and described the episode as a companion piece to the season eight episode "Homer's Enemy", in that a realistic character (Frank Grimes in that case) is placed in the unrealistic Simpsons universe and juxtaposed alongside Homer, creating conflict.

In an interview with the fan site NoHomers.net, Weinstein was asked if there had been any stories that he had come up with that did not make it into the show, to which he replied: "The great thing about The Simpsons is that we pretty much were able to get away with everything, so there weren't any episodes we really wanted to do that we couldn't do. Even the crazy high-concept ones like 'Two Bad Neighbors' and 'Homer's Enemy' we managed to put on the air because honestly there were no network execs there to stop us."

At the end of the episode, Gerald Ford moves into the house across the street after Bush leaves. When originally conceived, Richard Nixon was going to move in instead, though this was changed to Bob Dole following Nixon's death. The writers then decided it would be funnier if it were Ford since they believed he was the politician who best represented Homer. Keeler's first draft also included a musical number in the style of Tom Lehrer's satirical recordings, although this ended up being cut.

The episode features the first appearance of Disco Stu, who became a recurring character in the series. Stu was originally designed as a withered, old, John Travolta-esque figure and was to be voiced by repeat guest star Phil Hartman. However, when the animators remodeled the character, Hartman was not available to dub the voice and so Hank Azaria took over the role.

Merchandise
"Two Bad Neighbors" originally aired on the Fox network in the United States on January 14, 1996. The episode was selected for release in a 2000 video collection of selected political episodes of the show, titled: The Simpsons Political Party. The episode appeared on the second volume of the collection, together with the episode "Duffless" from season four. The episode was included in The Simpsons season seven DVD set, which was released on December 13, 2005. Keeler, Oakley, and Weinstein participated in the DVD's audio commentary, alongside Matt Groening and the director of the episode, Wes Archer.

Cultural references

Politics

George H. W. Bush 
There are also numerous references to events in George H. W. Bush's presidency, such as the vomiting incident at a Japanese banquet, the invasion of Panama to depose Manuel Noriega and the broken pledge not to raise taxes.

Grover Cleveland 
In response to George spanking Bart, Grandpa says: "Big deal! When I was a pup, we got spanked by presidents till the cows came home. Grover Cleveland spanked me on two non-consecutive occasions", referring to the only president to have served two non-consecutive terms in office.

TV 
The relationship between Bart and George is a homage to the United States television series Dennis the Menace from 1959, with the Bushes standing in for Dennis's elderly neighbors, the Wilsons.

Music 
When Homer and Bart hand out fliers for the upcoming garage sale, Apu Nahasapeemapetilon is seen washing his car while singing Cheap Trick's 1979 song "Dream Police".

Homer's song at the rummage sale is set to the tune of the songs "Big Spender" and "Stayin' Alive".

Reception
In its original broadcast, "Two Bad Neighbors" finished 52nd in the ratings for the week of January 7 to January 14, 1996, with a Nielsen rating of 9.9. The episode was the second-highest-rated show on the Fox network that week, following the NFC Championship postgame.

Since airing, the episode has received mostly positive reviews from fans and television critics. It was named by Vanity Fair John Ortved as the show's fifth-best episode. Ortved said, "While the Simpsons people have always claimed evenhandedness in their satire, the show is, after all, hardly right-leaning, and it is hard to miss how gleefully the former President is mocked here." Warren Martyn and Adrian Wood, the authors of the book I Can't Believe It's a Bigger and Better Updated Unofficial Simpsons Guide, wrote: "Very strange, this episode takes The Simpsons into a whole new dimension of political satire. The lampooning of a single public figure is a startling move. Works much better for Americans, we're told."

Dave Foster of DVD Times said: "Once again showing the mischievous relationship Bart and Homer share their pranks and the inevitable confrontations with George Bush Senior are as hilarious as they are implausible and frequent, but there is much to love about this episode in which the writers think out loud and paint The Simpsons and its characters as Bush once did." DVD Movie Guide's Colin Jacobson enjoyed the episode and said that it "offers the kind of episode that only The Simpsons could pull off well. The idea of bringing a president to live in Springfield is high-concept to say the least, and it could—and probably should—have bombed. However, the silliness works well and turns this into a great show." John Thorpe of Central Michigan Life named it the second-best episode of the series, and Rich Weir of AskMen.com named it the ninth-best episode.

References

Bibliography

External links

 
 

The Simpsons (season 7) episodes
1996 American television episodes
Cultural depictions of George H. W. Bush
Cultural depictions of Gerald Ford
Cultural depictions of Mikhail Gorbachev
Television episodes written by Ken Keeler

it:Episodi de I Simpson (settima stagione)#Due pessimi vicini di casa